Under the Western Freeway is the debut studio album by American indie rock band Grandaddy. It was released on October 21, 1997, by record label Will.

The album, while not commercially successful, was well received by music critics.

Release 

Under the Western Freeway was released on October 21, 1997. It was later reissued in the U.S. by V2 Records. It was also reissued in 2017 by Friendship Fever for its 20th anniversary.

Reception 

The album was well received by music critics.

CMJ New Music Monthly described it as "an eccentric psych-pop collection". Andy Gill of The Independent called it "one of the most beguiling debuts of the year [...] a fortuitous collision of Brian Wilson, Neil Young and the Pixies which throws out a stream of understated pop gems". AllMusic noted similarities to the bands Pavement and Weezer, and described it as "a fairly brilliant album, combining a warm, earnest and rustic feel with sometimes goofy experimentation". Frontman Jason Lytle's vocal performance was also praised; Jason Josephes of Pitchfork wrote: "If the lonely vocals of 'Lineage' and 'Collective Dreamwish of Upperclass Elegance' don't strike you there, you have no soul". Steve Taylor wrote in his book The A to X of Alternative Music that "Laughing Stock" is the album's standout track.

Track listing

References

External links 

 

1997 debut albums
Grandaddy albums